Henrico O. Atkins (born 8 September 1966) is a former Barbadian sprinter who competed in the men's 100m competition at the 1992 Summer Olympics. He recorded a 10.83, not enough to qualify for the next round past the heats. His personal best is 10.46, set in 1991. He also ran in the 200m in 1992, finishing with a 21.28, enough to advance to the next round, where a 21.19 was not enough to go further. In 1988, he also competed in both disciplines, but did not advance past either heat.

References

1966 births
Living people
Barbadian male sprinters
Athletes (track and field) at the 1988 Summer Olympics
Athletes (track and field) at the 1992 Summer Olympics
Olympic athletes of Barbados
Competitors at the 1986 Central American and Caribbean Games
Athletes (track and field) at the 1991 Pan American Games
Pan American Games competitors for Barbados
Central American and Caribbean Games bronze medalists for Barbados
World Athletics Championships athletes for Barbados
Central American and Caribbean Games medalists in athletics